Dexter may refer to:

Arts and entertainment
 Dexter, the main character of the American animated series Dexter's Laboratory that aired from 1996 to 2003
 Dexter, a fictional character in the British web series Diary of a Bad Man
 Dexter, the Pokédex in Kanto and Johto in the Pokémon anime; See Gameplay of Pokémon
 Dexter Morgan, the protagonist of the Dexter entertainment franchise
 Dexter (comics), a 2013 Marvel Comics limited series comic book based on the Dexter Morgan novels
 Dexter (TV series) (2006–2013, 2021-2022), an American television drama series loosely based on the series of novels by Jeff Lindsay
 "Dexter" (Dexter episode), the eponymous series pilot and first episode
 Dexter: Music from the Showtime Original Series, a soundtrack album
 Dexter: New Blood, a revival miniseries set 10 years after the original TV series

Businesses
 Dexter Air Taxi, a Russian air taxi service
 Dexter Construction, a Canadian construction and environmental services company

People
 Dexter (name), a surname and a given name (including a list of people)
 Dexter (singer), Brazilian rapper Marcos Fernandes de Omena (born 1973)
 Famous Dex, also known as Dexter, American rapper Dexter Tiewon Gore Jr. (born 1993)

Places

United States
 Dexter, Georgia, a town
 Dexter, Illinois, an unincorporated community 
 Dexter, Indiana, an unincorporated community 
 Dexter, Iowa, a city
 Dexter Township, Cowley County, Kansas
 Dexter, Kansas, a city
 Dexter, Kentucky, an unincorporated community 
 Dexter, Maine, a town
 Dexter (CDP), Maine, a census-designated place
 Dexter Regional Airport
 Dexter Township, Michigan
 Dexter, Michigan, a city (unassociated with the township, though nearby)
 Dexter Township, Mower County, Minnesota
 Dexter, Minnesota, a city
 Dexter, Missouri, a city
 Dexter, New Mexico, a town
 Dexter, New York, a village
 Dexter Marsh
 Dexter City, Ohio, a village
 Dexter, Oregon, an unincorporated community in Lane County
 Dexter State Recreation Site, Lane County, Oregon, a state park
 Dexter Reservoir, also known as Dexter Lake, near Dexter, Oregon
 Dexter, Wisconsin, a town
 Dexter (community), Wisconsin, an unincorporated community in the town of Friendship

Canada
 Dexter, a community in Central Elgin, Ontario

Schools in the United States
 Dexter High School (Michigan), Dexter, Michigan
 Dexter Regional High School, Dexter, Maine
 Dexter School, a private boys' school in Brookline, Massachusetts

Science and technology
 dexter, an instance of psychometric software
 Dexter (malware), a computer virus
 Dexter (robot), a dynamically balancing bipedal humanoid robot research project by Anybots
 Dexter Award, presented by the American Chemical Society from 1956 until 2001
 Dexter National Fish Hatchery & Technology Center, Dexter, New Mexico, United States

Ships
 USCGC Dexter, United States Coast Guard ships
 USRC Dexter, United States Revenue Cutter Service ships

Structures
 Dexter Building, Chicago, Illinois, United States
 Dexter Cabin, Leadville, Colorado, United States
 Dexter House (disambiguation)

Other uses
 Dexter, Latin for the direction "right"
 Dexter, in dexter and sinister, a heraldic term referring to the right of the bearer of the arms (to the left for a viewer)
 Dexter hand, right-handedness
 Dexter cattle, a breed of cattle

See also
 Dexterville (disambiguation)
 Dextral, a scientific term
 Dextre, a robot on the International Space Station